Franz Brunner (10 July 1931 – 14 December 2014) was an Austrian wrestler. He competed at the 1952 Summer Olympics, the 1956 Summer Olympics and the 1960 Summer Olympics. At the 1955 World Championship, he finished in 4th place.

References

External links
 

1931 births
2014 deaths
Austrian male sport wrestlers
Olympic wrestlers of Austria
Wrestlers at the 1952 Summer Olympics
Wrestlers at the 1956 Summer Olympics
Wrestlers at the 1960 Summer Olympics
Sportspeople from Vienna